"Bye Bye Bayou" is a single by LCD Soundsystem released on November 7, 2009, to coincide with the Record Store Day offshoot, Vinyl Saturday.  The song itself is a cover of Suicide vocalist Alan Vega's 1980 song of the same name.

Track listing
A. "Bye Bye Bayou" (Main Version) - 7:10
B. "Bye Bye Bayou" (A Capella Version) - 6:51

References

LCD Soundsystem songs
2009 singles
Songs written by Alan Vega
2009 songs